Madi Rural Municipality (Nepali : मादी गाउँपालिका) is a Gaunpalika in Kaski District in Gandaki Province of Nepal. On 12 March 2017, the government of Nepal implemented a new local administrative structure, with the implementation of the new local administrative structure, VDSs have been replaced with municipal and Village Councils. Madi is one of these 753 local units.

Demographics
At the time of the 2011 Nepal census, Madi Rural Municipality had a population of 18,153. Of these, 65.2% spoke Nepali, 31.6% Gurung, 1.6% Tamang, 0.9% Magar, 0.3% Bhujel, 0.1% Yolmo, 0.1% Newar, 0.1% Urdu and 0.2% other languages as their first language.

In terms of ethnicity/caste, 32.8% were Gurung, 24.6% Hill Brahmin, 11.5% Kami, 11.1% Chhetri, 7.1% Damai/Dholi, 5.1% Sarki, 1.8% Magar, 1.7% Tamang, 1.4% Gharti/Bhujel, 1.2% Thakuri, 0.6% Sanyasi/Dasnami, 0.5% Badi, 0.2% Newar, 0.1% Yolmo, 0.1% Musalman, 0.1% other Terai and 0.2% others.

In terms of religion, 73.7% were Hindu, 21.1% Buddhist, 0.7% Christian, 0.6% Bon, 0.1% Muslim and 3.8% others.

In terms of literacy, 67.0% could both read and write, 2.7% could only read and 30.2% could neither read nor write.

References 

 http://un.org.np/maps/district-maps/western/Kaski.pdf

Gandaki Province
Kaski District
Rural municipalities of Nepal established in 2017
Rural municipalities in Kaski District